Bedlam is Christopher Brookmyre's seventeenth novel.  It was published in the United Kingdom on 7 February 2013. The book has been turned into a video game, also written by Brookmyre.

Characters in Bedlam 
 Ross Baker - protagonist, a scientist employed by Neurosphere
 Carol - Ross' girlfriend
 Solderburn - Ross' friend and an inventor
 Juno
 Lieutenant Kamnor
 Sargeant Gortoss
 Isaac Michaels/Ankou - the antagonist
 The Sandman (Alex)
 Iris

References 

2013 British novels
Novels by Christopher Brookmyre
British science fiction novels
Orbit Books books